During the 2017–18 season, CD Lugo are participating in the Spanish LaLiga 1|2|3, and the Copa del Rey.

Squad

Transfers
List of Spanish football transfers summer 2017#Lugo

In

Out

Competitions

Overall

Liga

League table

Matches

Kickoff times are in CET.

Copa del Rey

References

CD Lugo seasons
CD Lugo